Blue Arc may refer to
 the Daegu Stadium
 BlueArc - a company manufacturing Network-attached storage devices